The 1980 Prague Skate was held November 1980. Medals were awarded in the disciplines of men's singles, ladies' singles, pair skating, and ice dancing.

Men

Ladies

Pairs

Ice dancing

References

Prague Skate
Prague Skate